Glyphipterix compastis is a species of sedge moths in the genus Glyphipterix. It was described by Edward Meyrick in 1923. It is found in India (Assam).

References

Moths described in 1923
Glyphipterigidae
Moths of Asia